Tacinga inamoena is a species of plant in the family Cactaceae. It is endemic to Brazil.  Its natural habitats are subtropical or tropical dry forests, subtropical or tropical dry shrubland, and rocky areas. It is threatened by habitat loss.

References

Flora of Brazil
inamoena
Least concern plants
Taxonomy articles created by Polbot